Santa Maria del Suffragio may refer to:

 Santa Maria del Suffragio, L'Aquila
 Santa Maria del Suffragio, Ravenna
 Santa Maria del Suffragio, Rome